BoHo Theatre (incorporated as Bohemian Theatre Ensemble) is a non-profit Chicago-based theatre company. Founded in 2003, their productions have garnered praise (including Top Ten production assignations from the Chicago Tribune, and Time Out Chicago), and have been favored with Joseph Jefferson Award (Jeff Award) recommendations and citations for several productions. The company was helmed by founding artistic director Stephen Genovese until 2010, when he was succeeded by current artistic director Peter Marston Sullivan.

BoHo Theatre's mission is "to create bold theatre that challenges convention through innovative storytelling and unites artist and audience in the examination of truth, beauty, freedom, and love  through the lens of human relationships." The Company presents plays and musicals in a variety of genres and considers itself an incubator for up-and-coming Chicago talent. Over its lifetime, the company's productions have been nominated for 73 non-Equity Jeff Awards (winning 14), won five After Dark Awards, and a Black Theatre Alliance Award. In 2013, BoHo Theatre received a Business Leadership Award from the Rogers Park Business Alliance, along with neighborhood theatres Lifeline Theatre, Theo Ubique, the side project.

Noted productions of critical acclaim include Next To Normal, Parade, Veronica's Room, Hauptmann, Floyd Collins, The Glorious Ones, The Wild Party, and Side Show.

See also 
 Theatre in Chicago

References 

 Time Out Chicago Top Ten Stage Picks of 2005
 Tribune review of The Wild Party
 Chicago Sun-Times review of The Wild Party
 Chicago Stage Review of The Glorious Ones
 Talkin' Broadway review of The Glorious Ones

External links 
 Official website

Theatre companies in Chicago